Realp railway station is a metre gauge station serving the municipality of Realp, in the Canton of Uri, Switzerland.  The station is close to the eastern portal of the Furka Base Tunnel, on the Furka Oberalp Bahn (FO), which connects Brig in Valais, via Andermatt in Uri, with Göschenen, Uri, and Disentis/Mustér, Graubünden.  Since , the FO has been owned and operated by the Matterhorn Gotthard Bahn (MGB), following a merger between the FO and the Brig-Visp-Zermatt railway (BVZ).

Not far from Realp station is another railway station, Realp DFB, which serves the Furka Steam Railway, a heritage railway operating in summer over the part of the FO that was replaced by the Furka Base Tunnel in 1982.

Services 
The following services stop at Realp:

The long-distance Glacier Express passes through Realp without stopping; the Glacier Express ceased stopping at Realp in late 2015.

See also

Glacier Express
Car shuttle train
Matterhorn Gotthard Bahn
Furka Base Tunnel
Furka Oberalp Bahn

References

Notes

Further reading

External links
 Matterhorn Gotthard Bahn 
 Official timetable of Switzerland

Matterhorn Gotthard Bahn stations
Railway stations in the canton of Uri
Railway stations in Switzerland opened in 1926